World on the Move is a nature radio series broadcast weekly on BBC Radio 4. It is presented by Philippa Forrester and Brett Westwood. It is about migration in the natural world, and includes features on birds, mammals fish, frogs, toads, and insects. The programs include many reports from scientists in-the-field in various places worldwide. Observations from viewers are incorporated in some of the reports and statistics.

References 
 BBC World on the Move website page

BBC Radio 4 programmes